Deir al-Salib (also spelled Deir al-Sleib or Deir al-Suleib) is a village in northern Syria, administratively part of the Hama Governorate, located 37 kilometers west of Hama. Nearby localities include Bil'in to the southeast, al-Rabiaa to the east, Asilah to the northeast, Jubb Ramlah to the north, al-Laqbah and Deir Mama to the northwest, Masyaf to the west, al-Suwaydah to the southwest and Baarin and Aqrab to the south. According to the Syria Central Bureau of Statistics, Deir al-Salib had a population of 2,946 in the 2004 census. Its inhabitants are predominantly Alawites and Greek Orthodox Christians.

History
In the early 19th-century the Ottoman governor of Damascus, Abdullah Pasha al-Azm, granted the leaseholds of Deir al-Salib and its satellite farms to a close associate of his, Muhammad Gharib Bey al-Azm.

Byzantine church
Just outside Deir al-Salib is a 5th-6th century Byzantine-era church surrounded by fig trees. It is built in the architectural style typical of the Justinian period in Syria, with its two chapels. Its stone walls have a beige and ochre color. At the right of the entrance is a baptistery which still contains a cross-shaped baptismal. The narthex of the church is preceded by a central atrium and five columns demarcate its aisles. The apse is semi-circular and on the ground floor stands a gallery reserved for women. A small mausoleum containing three sarcophagi is situated at the side of the baptistery. The sarcophagi had engraved medallions that fitted crosses.

References

Bibliography

Populated places in Masyaf District
Alawite communities in Syria
Eastern Orthodox Christian communities in Syria